The Egyptian Quiver Party or Egyptian Kenana Party  is a political party that calls for free trade and social justice.

References

External links
Quiver Party website

2009 establishments in Egypt
Political parties in Egypt
Political parties established in 2009